Dimitrios Panidis (born 19 October 2001) is a Greek professional footballer who plays as a forward for Super League 2 club PAOK B.

Career

Early career
Dimitris Panidis came to PAOK in 2018 from Bebides. He was immediately acknowledged as an attacker, with speed and the ability to penetrate defences, and one who plays both in the center and on the flanks. He can play with boot feet equally well and has an eye for goal. He is also a serious and consistent character, and a student of TEFAA Serres. He was, of course, one of the key contributors to the great success of the Under-19 side (53 matches, 21 goals). At the beginning of 2021, he was loaned to Trikala, where he received a «baptism of fire» in Super League 2.

References

External links

2001 births
Living people
Footballers from Thessaloniki
Greek footballers
Association football forwards
PAOK FC players
Trikala F.C. players
PAOK FC B players